The Nigerian energy supply crisis refers to the ongoing failure of the Nigerian power sector to provide adequate electricity supply to domestic households and industrial producers despite a rapidly growing economy, some of the world's largest deposits of coal, oil, and gas and the country's status as Africa's largest oil producer. Currently, only 45% of Nigeria's population is connected to the energy grid whilst power supply difficulties are experienced around 85% of the time and almost nonexistent in certain regions. At best, average daily power supply is estimated at four hours, although several days can go by without any power at all. Neither power cuts nor restorations are announced, leading to calls for a load shedding schedule during the COVID-19 lockdowns to aid fair distribution and predictability.

Power supply difficulties cripple the agricultural, industrial, and mining sectors and impede Nigeria's ongoing economic development. The energy supply crisis is complex, stems from a variety of issues, and has been ongoing for decades. Most Nigerian businesses and households that can afford to do so run one or more diesel-fueled generators to supplement the intermittent supply.

Since 2005, Nigerian power reforms have focused on privatizing the generator and distribution assets and encouraging private investment in the power sector. The government continues to control transmission assets whilst making "modest progress" in creating a regulatory environment attractive to foreign investors. Minor increases in average daily power supply have been reported.

Background
Until the power sector reforms of 2005, power supply and transmission was the sole responsibility of the Nigerian federal government.

As of 2012, Nigeria generated approximately 4,000 - 5,000 megawatts of power for a population of 150 million people as compared with Africa's second-largest economy, South Africa, which generated 40,000 megawatts of power for a population of 62 million. An estimated 14 - 20 gigawatts of power is provided by private generators to make up for the shortfall. Nigeria has a theoretical capacity of more than 10,000-megawatt generation capacity using existing infrastructure but has never reached close to that potential.

96% of industry energy consumption is produced off-grid using private generators.

Issues affect all areas of the sector, from generation to transmission to distribution.

Currently, the only plan the government has in place to help solve the energy crisis is to expand the fossil fuel burning sector. Alternative forms of energy are not used probably because of availability of oil in Nigeria, as it has the world’s seventh largest oil reserves.

History of the Power Sector 

 1886 - First two power generators installed in the Colony of Lagos
 1951 - Act of Parliament establishes the Electricity Corporation of Nigeria (ECN)
 1962 - The Niger DamsAuthority (NDA) was also established for the development of hydroelectric power
 1972 - Merger of ECN and NDA to create the National Electric Power Authority (NEPA) 
 2005 - Following reforms, the NEPA was renamed Power Holding Company of Nigeria (PHCN). The Electric Power Sector Reform (EPSR) Act was enacted allowing private investment in electricity generation, transmission, and distribution.
 November 2005, the Nigerian Electricity Regulatory Commission (NERC) was inaugurated and charged with the responsibility of tariffs regulation and monitoring of the quality of services of the PHCN.
 February 1, 2015 - The Transitional Electricity Market (TEM) announced

Current Challenges

Power Generators 
The most efficient location for new power plants in the Niger Delta region due to the easy access to the sources of energy needed to run the plants.

Transmission Network 
Post-reforms the transmission network continues to be government-owned and operated and remains the weakest link in the power sector supply chain. Transmission lines are old and at the point of system collapse on any given day. Even should more power be generated, the transmission network is unable to carry any additional power loading. Designed for a peak capacity of only 3,000 to 3,500MW per day breakdown of the lines is a daily occurrence. Lack of maintenance and security challenges in parts of the country only adds to the difficulties.

Currently, Nigeria uses four different types of energy: natural gas, oil, hydro, and coal The energy sector is heavily dependent on petroleum as a method for electricity production which has slowed down the development of alternative forms of energy. Three out of the four above resources used for energy production in Nigeria are linked with increasing greenhouse gas emissions: coal, oil, and natural gas, with coal, emitting the worst of the three.

Solution to the energy and environmental problem in Nigeria
To increase the energy production in the country, the Federal government has started investing in solar power. Nigeria is a tropical country with a large amount of insolation coming from the sun. She has involved solar companies such as Hansa Energy and Arnergy in Nigeria to help in the mass production of solar plants and the distribution of solar systems for households and businesses. The Rural electrification project embarked upon by the federal government is poised to supply solar systems to  5 million households. Which will be a great way of increasing the energy supply in the country.

See the table below for a summary of the environmental impacts of the sources of electricity.

According to the World Commission on Environment and Development (WCED), the importance of sustainability in energy is the ability to preserve its use, the importance of energy in living standards and for economic development and the significant impacts that energy systems and processes have had and continue to have on the environment (WCED, 1987). Nigeria needs to invest in sustainable resources because of the obvious signs that it will be strongly impacted by environmental change such as desertification, droughts, flooding, and water shortages. The biggest blow to Nigeria would be the low-lying areas that contain many of their natural resources being flooded if ocean levels rise as predicted (Gujba, Mulugetta & Azapagic, 2011).
Since further development of hydro-electricity does not seem practical because of the dependence on the seasons for amount of water supply (Ajayi, 2009). Wind energy has potential but is unreliable for consistent energy supply. Nuclear energy could be a viable solution to the energy problem because of its lack of emissions and reliability. Nigeria also has easy access to the uranium needed for the plants (Ejiogu, 2013).

Environmental Solutions
In light of all this, there is a lot of literature surrounding different proposals of what might be done to help Nigeria develop its potential for renewable electricity. The development of renewable sources of energy is important for the future of the world. Nigeria has been in an energy crisis for a decade despite numerous attempts to reform the energy sector (Ejiogu, 2012). The only thing that remains is to figure out which energy source is most practical for Nigeria.
The development of hydroelectricity does not seem practical because of the dependence on the seasons for the amount of water supply as well as the amount of greenhouse gases it emits in the first 10 years of being built (Middleton, 2013). Wind energy has potential but is unreliable for consistent energy supply.

Two fields of arguments:

The most practical solution was mentioned by Gujba, Mulugetta, and Azapagic, (2011). The authors of this article suggested that a harmonization of different forms of energy take place. In their sustainable development scenario, they suggested some reliance on renewable energy sources and a slow change from fossil fuels to renewable energy sources. Since the rural areas are further from the electricity grid and most currently do not have power, each area would become a little hub where they would produce their own power by whatever resource was closest. For example, in the northern areas, the mini-grids would work off of wind and solar power energy. Hydropower development would have to increase in order for this to be successful.  
Winkler, Howells, and Baumert (2002) talk about envisioning where a country wants to end up before the development of energy resources. This is a great perspective about how to fix the energy crisis because taking the big picture into account before the development of the sector could include things outside of simply fixing the energy crisis such as poverty eradication, job creation, reducing carbon emissions, etc.  Fixing the energy supply will solve many problems such as the overpricing of electricity due to the loss of the electricity within the grid (Winkler, Howells & Baumert, 2002).

Process and Industrial Developments dispute 
Process and Industrial Developments Ltd (P&ID) entered into a 20-year contract with the Nigerian government for natural gas supply and processing. Nigeria provided the gas, which PI&D refined so that it could be used to power the Nigerian electrical grid. PI&D could keep valuable byproducts for its own use. In 2012, PI&D demanded arbitration in London, alleging that Nigeria had not supplied the agreed quantity of gas or to construct the infrastructure it had agreed to build. The arbitral tribunal awarded damages of more than £4.8 billion. The compensation was valued £8.15 billion with interest when the case was heard in London High Court in December 2022.

References

See also
Energy crisis

Energy crises
Energy in Nigeria